Chancelloria is a genus of early animals known from the Middle Cambrian Burgess Shale, the Comley limestone, the Wheeler Shale, the Bright Angel Shale and elsewhere. It is named after Chancellor Peak. It was first described in 1920 by Charles Doolittle Walcott, who regarded them as one of the most primitive groups of sponges. However, they are currently thought to be member of the group Chancelloriidae. 178 specimens of Chancelloria are known from the Greater Phyllopod bed, where they comprise 0.34% of the community.

References

External links 
 

Burgess Shale fossils
Enigmatic prehistoric animal genera
Taxa named by Charles Doolittle Walcott
Fossil taxa described in 1920
Cambrian genus extinctions
Wheeler Shale
Paleozoic life of Newfoundland and Labrador
Paleozoic life of Nova Scotia
Paleozoic life of Quebec